Magic Dragon can refer to:

 Kazuharu Sonoda (1956-1987), a Japanese professional wrestler using the ring name "Magic Dragon"
 "Magic Dragon", a song on the album Agent Orange by the thrash metal band Sodom
 Piff the Magic Dragon (born 1980), a magician and comedian from the United Kingdom
 "Puff, the Magic Dragon", a 1963 song by Peter, Paul and Mary
 A microlift glider that is an advancement from the basic Carbon Dragon design
 A nickname for the Douglas AC-47 Spooky gunship

See also

 Stuff the Magic Dragon, the team mascot for the Orlando Magic
 
 Magic (disambiguation)
 Dragon (disambiguation)
 Puff the Magic Dragon (disambiguation)